An interstate is a type of high-speed, limited-access highway in the United States, part of the Interstate Highway System.

Interstate may also refer to:

Media
Interstate 60 (2002), a metaphysical comedy/drama road film
Interstate (album), a 1995 album by Pell Mell
"Interstate" (song), a song from the album Tear the Signs Down (2010) by The Automatic
Interstate '76, a  vehicular-combat video game for the Microsoft Windows computer-operating system
Interstate '82, the sequel to Interstate '76

Transportation
United States Numbered Highway System, also called the first interstate highway system in the United States
New England Interstate Routes, one of the regional precursors of the Interstate Highway System in the United States

Other uses
Interstate (duo), an American-based musical duo
Interstate (typeface), a humanist sans-serif typeface designed by Tobias Frere-Jones 
Interstate Aircraft, a former American company
Interstate Bakeries Corporation
Interstate Batteries, an American company that markets automotive batteries
Interstate commerce, see Commerce Clause, an enumerated power listed in the United States Constitution (Article I, Section 8, Clause 3)
Interstate compact, a pact or treaty among various states of the United States, or between states and any foreign government
Interstate system (world-systems theory), a theory of state relationships within world-systems theory
Interactions between two or more nations, commonly called 'international'
Events, transactions, travel, interactions, etc. between or amongst two or more States and territories of Australia

See also